Celestún Municipality (Yucatec Maya: "terror of stone") is one of the 106 municipalities in the Mexican state of Yucatán containing (868.63 km2) of land and is located roughly  west of the city of Mérida.

History
There is no accurate data on when the town was founded, but it was a settlement before the conquest and was located in the chieftainship of Ah-Canul. After colonization, the area was one of the few that did not become part of the encomienda system, and was established in 1718, as a town under the jurisdiction of Sisal, where it served as an important source of salt.

Yucatán declared its independence from the Spanish Crown in 1821 and the area was transferred from Sisal to the Maxcanú Municipality in 1872. In 1918 the area became its own municipality.

Governance
The municipal president is elected for a three-year term. The town council has four councilpersons, who serve as Secretary and councilors of heritage and public monuments; public security; public works, nomenclature and recruitment; and public buildings and ecology.

Communities
The head of the municipality is Celestún, Yucatán. Among the other populated places of the municipality are Calan, Chamúl, Chín, Hoyuelos, Man, Stal and Tzate. The significant populations are shown below:

Local festivals

Every year from 1 to 12 December the town celebrates the feast of the Immaculate Conception. There is also an annual celebration on 1 June for Navy Day.

Tourist attractions
 Church of the Immaculate Conception
 Birding

References

Municipalities of Yucatán